Dâmbul Rotund  (Hungarian Kerekdomb) is a housing district in north-western Cluj-Napoca.

Districts of Cluj-Napoca